Lophocampa oblita is a moth of the family Erebidae described by Benoit Vincent in 2009. It was described by Max Gaede in 1923 under the name Halisidota fasciata. It is found in Bolivia.

Taxonomy
Since L. fasciata is preoccupied by Euhalisidota fasciata, described by Augustus Radcliffe Grote in 1867, Lophocampa oblita was proposed by Vincent in 2009 as the replacement name.

References

Moths described in 1923
oblita
Moths of South America